Child of the Sun may refer to:
Child of the Sun, a group of buildings on the campus of Florida Southern College
Child of the Sun (album), by Mayte Garcia, produced by Prince
Child of the Sun, 1942 Science Fiction story by Leigh Brackett 
Child of the Sun, 1966 Historical Fiction novel by Kyle Onstott and Lance Horner
Child of the Sun, a song from the 1980 album Land of Gold by Goombay Dance Band.

See also
Children of the Sun (disambiguation)